Time Exposure is the sixth studio album by Little River Band (LRB), which was recorded with producer George Martin at Associated Independent Recording (AIR) in Montserrat and released in September 1981. It peaked at No. 9 on the Australian Kent Music Report Albums Chart. In the United States, it reached No. 21 on the Billboard 200.

It was the group's last album with Glenn Shorrock on lead vocals until 1988. In the interim John Farnham took over as main lead vocalist, staying with the band for the next three studio albums. Time Exposure was also the last album with lead guitarist, David Briggs, who left prior to its release. He was replaced on tour by Stephen Housden, who later joined the group. The album had other band members on lead vocals: Beeb Birtles on two tracks, "Ballerina" and "Guiding Light", and Wayne Nelson on the single "The Night Owls" which peaked at #6 on Billboard's Hot 100, while "Take It Easy On Me" went to #10 and Man On Your Mind" was #14.

Reception
Cash Box magazine said "This pop-rock sextet practically owns Australia, and it doesn't do too badly on the airwaves elsewhere in the world. This time, the inventive Aussies have recruited Beatles studio wizard George Martin as producer, and the musical marriage is one made in heaven. The first three songs on Time Exposure's first side are all potential top 40 hits."

Track listing

Personnel 
Glenn Shorrock - lead vocals
Beeb Birtles - acoustic guitar, electric guitar, vocals, lead vocals on "Ballerina" and "Guiding Light"
Graeham Goble - acoustic guitar, electric guitar, vocals
Wayne Nelson - bass guitar, vocals, lead vocals on "The Night Owls"
Derek Pellicci – drums, percussion
David Briggs - acoustic guitar, lead guitar

Additional musicians
Bill Cuomo – Prophet 5 synthesizer , clavinet, Hammond organ
Peter Jones – acoustic piano, electric piano, Hammond organ

Production
Producer: George Martin
Recorded at Air Studios (Montserrat), West Indies
Engineered by Geoff Emerick and Ernie Rose
Tape Operator: Michael Stavrou
Mastered at Capitol Records Studios, Hollywood, California by Wally Traugott

Charts

Weekly charts

Year-end charts

Certifications

References

External links 
 [ Allmusic review]

Little River Band albums
1981 albums
Albums produced by George Martin
Capitol Records albums
EMI Records albums
Albums recorded at AIR Studios